Rupakot, Gandaki may refer to:

Rupakot, Kaski, in the Gandaki Pradesh of Nepal
Rupakot, Tanahu, in the Gandaki Pradesh of Nepal